Epaphroditidae is a family of the Mantodea, containing species found in Africa and the Caribbean.  Before 2015, it had been placed as the subfamily Epaphroditinae, in the Hymenopodidae, but is now excluded.

Subfamilies and Genera
The Mantodea Species File lists two subfamilies containing the genera:

Epaphroditinae
tribe Callimantini
 Callimantis Stal, 1877 - monotypic (C. antillarum Saussure, 1859)
tribe Epaphroditini
 Epaphrodita Serville, 1831

Gonatistinae
 Gonatista Saussure, 1869
 Gonatistella Giglio-Tos, 1915 - monotypic (G. nigropicta Westwood, 1889)

Now moved
 Brancsikia Saussure & Zehntner, 1895 is in the new (2019) family Majangidae.

References

External links

Mantodea families